Mitali Roy is an Indian politician from the state of West Bengal. She is the daughter of Jagadananda Roy who was ex MIC and MLA of Falakata. She is a first term member of the West Bengal Legislative Assembly.

Constituency
Roy represents the Dhupguri (Vidhan Sabha constituency). Roy won the Dhupguri (Vidhan Sabha constituency) on an All India Trinamool Congress ticket. She beat the sitting member of the West Bengal Legislative Assembly, Mamata Roy of the Communist Party of India (Marxist) by over 18000 votes.

Political Party  
Roy is from the All India Trinamool Congress.

References 

Living people
West Bengal MLAs 2016–2021
Trinamool Congress politicians from West Bengal
Year of birth missing (living people)